Passiflora yucatanensis is a rare species of passionflower, known only from the Mexican island of Cozumel, which has recently been introduced to horticulture.

yucatanensis
Cozumel